FSI may refer to:

Economics 
 Financial services industry
 Financial Secrecy Index, a ranking of secrecy jurisdictions
 Financial Stability Institute, a body of the Bank for International Settlements

Government and politics 
 Federation of Italian Socialists, a defunct political party of Italy
 Foreign Service Institute, of the United States government
 Foreign Service Institute, India, an agency of the Indian government
 Forest Survey of India
 Fragile States Index, a country ranking method
 Internal Security Forces, the national security force of Lebanon

Technology 
 Flame spread index
 Fluid-structure interaction
 Frequency scanning interferometry
 FRISK Software International, an Icelandic antivirus software developer
 FRU Support Interface, a simple bus for low-level access to IBM Power-based hardware
 FSI International, an American equipment manufacturer
 Fuel stratified injection
 Full spectral imaging

Other uses 
 Fédération Ivoirienne du Scoutisme, the Ivorian Scouting Federation
 Ferrovie dello Stato Italiane, the Italian state-owned railway company
 FlightSafety International, an American aviation training provider
 Floor space index
 Florida Space Institute, of the State University System of Florida
 FontShop International, a German type foundry
 Fox Sports International
 Freeman Spogli Institute for International Studies, at Stanford University
 Free Sons of Israel, a fraternal organization
 IATA code for Henry Post Army Airfield, in Fort Sill, Oklahoma, United States
 Italian Chess Federation
 Free-standing insert, a type of advertising: See